Ategumia is a genus of moths of the family Crambidae.

Species
Ategumia actealis (Walker, 1859)
Ategumia adipalis (Lederer, 1863)
Ategumia crocealis (Dognin, 1906)
Ategumia dilecticolor (Dyar, 1912)
Ategumia ebulealis (Guenée, 1854)
Ategumia fatualis (Lederer, 1863)
Ategumia insipidalis (Lederer, 1863)
Ategumia longidentalis (Dognin, 1904)
Ategumia matutinalis (Guenée, 1854)
Ategumia nalotalis (Schaus, 1924)

References

Spilomelinae
Crambidae genera
Taxa named by Hans Georg Amsel